The Trinity Hymnal is a Christian hymnal written and compiled both by and for those from a Presbyterian background. It has been released in two editions (both of which are used in churches today) and is published by Great Commission Publications, a joint project between the Orthodox Presbyterian Church and the Presbyterian Church in America.

A Baptist Edition also exists for the use of Reformed Baptist congregations.

Versions

The 1961 hymnal was originally compiled by the Orthodox Presbyterian Church in 1961 as a hymnbook that would include traditional hymns as well as musical arrangements of the Psalms suitable for Reformed worship.

The 1990 hymnal is official (but not required) in the Presbyterian Church in America and Orthodox Presbyterian Church, and is also approved by denominations such as the Associate Reformed Presbyterian Church. This version includes responsive readings from all 150 Psalms and The Westminster Confession of Faith.

The Baptist Edition
In 1995, the Trinity Hymnal (Baptist Edition) was published and was identical to the 1961 hymnal, other than an addition of 42 Psalter selections, and a few changes related to doctrine. Hymns supporting infant baptism were replaced with ones about believer's baptism, and the Westminster Confession of Faith was replaced by the 1689 Baptist Confession of Faith.

See also
List of Presbyterian Hymnals

References

External links
1961 Trinity Hymnal
1990 Trinity Hymnal

Protestant hymnals
Orthodox Presbyterian Church
Presbyterianism
1961 books
1961 in music
1961 in Christianity
Presbyterian Church in America